Walter de Amersham, also known as Walter de Agsmundesham (died 1304) was the Lord Chancellor of Scotland during the English administration in Scotland from 1296 to 1304.

Biography
He was a Royal Clerk and Justice of the Peace during the reign of Edward I of England. He was appointed in 1291 as assistant to Alan de St Edmund, the Chancellor for Scotland. Walter was paid 10 merks every month for his service. During 1296, Walter was appointed to the position of Chancellor of Scotland during the English administration in Scotland and served in this function until his death in 1304.

Walter is known to have had two sons Alan and Thomas, whom his property was divided between.

Citations

References
Keith, Robert, An Historical Catalogue of the Scottish Bishops: Down to the Year 1688, (London, 1924)

People of Medieval Scotland - Walter of Agmondesham (Amersham), clerk

1304 deaths
English people of the Wars of Scottish Independence
13th-century English people
Lord chancellors of Scotland
Year of birth unknown